Chorizanthe biloba is a species of flowering plant in the buckwheat family known by the common name twolobe spineflower. It is endemic to California, where it is known only from the Central Coast Ranges. There are two varieties, both of which are uncommon to rare.

C. b. var. biloba is known from several areas of the Central Coast Ranges, including the foothills of the Santa Lucia Mountains and Diablo Range. It grows erect up to 40 centimeters tall. It produces an inflorescence of several flowers, each surrounded by six bracts tipped in hooked spines. The tiny flower has deeply notched or jagged tepals.

The rare C. b. var. immemora, the Hernandez spineflower, is known from only about five occurrences near the border between San Benito and Monterey Counties. It is similar to var. biloba but has more shallow notches in its tepals.

References

External links
Taxon Report 2013: Chorizanthe biloba
Jepson Manual Treatment: var. biloba
Jepson Manual Treatment: var. immemora
Photo gallery: var. biloba
Photo gallery: var. immemora

biloba
Endemic flora of California
Natural history of the California chaparral and woodlands
Natural history of the California Coast Ranges
Natural history of Monterey County, California
Natural history of San Benito County, California
Natural history of San Luis Obispo County, California
~
~
Taxa named by Thomas Nuttall